Colloquial Finnish and spoken Finnish refer to the unstandardized spoken variety of the Finnish language, in contrast with the standardized form of the language. It is used primarily in personal communication and varies somewhat between the different dialects.

This article focuses on the variety of spoken Finnish that is predominant in the Greater Helsinki region and urbanized areas in the Tavastian and Central Finland dialectal areas, such as the cities of Tampere, Jyväskylä, Lahti, Hyvinkää, and Hämeenlinna – as well as in coastal cities such as Vaasa and Porvoo, which have been traditionally Swedish-speaking and have experienced an influx of Finnish speakers from a variety of dialectal areas.

The standard language takes most of its features from these dialects, i.e. most "dialectal" features are reductions with respect to this form of language. The combination of the common spoken Finnish and a dialect gives a regional variant, which has some local idiosyncrasies but is essentially similar to the common spoken Finnish.

The basics of Finnish needed to fully understand this article can be found in pages about Finnish phonology and Finnish grammar.

Introduction 
As in any language, the spoken version(s) of Finnish often vary from the written form. Some of the latter's constructs are either too arbitrary (e.g. "soft d", cf. Finnish phonology), or too dialectal, e.g.  (see below), for use in the spoken language. Furthermore, some very common and "accentless" sound changes are not reflected in the standard language, particularly fusion, liaison and some diphthong reductions.

There is also the problem that purists want to avoid irregularity regardless of actual usage. This has left some sound changes common in spoken language out from the standard language. There is a tendency to favor "more logical" constructs over easily pronounceable ones. This ideal does reflect spoken Finnish usage to a degree, as Finnish is demonstrably a conservative language with few reduction processes, but it is not entirely accurate. The problem of avoiding "irregularity" is most evident in spelling, where internal sandhi is not transcribed, because there is the idea that morphemes should be immutable.

There are also a number of grammatical forms which are used in written Finnish, but only very rarely in spoken. For example, there are a number of constructions using participles which are usually rendered analytically in speech. Some cases and moods are rarely constructive in spoken Finnish, e.g. the instructive and comitative cases and the potential mood. Some survive only in expressions.

On the other hand, spoken language has its own features rarely or never found in formal language. Most importantly, there is very common external sandhi, and some assimilatory sound changes. (On the contrary, there is no vowel reduction.) In some variants (e.g.

Pronunciation

Reflexes of dental fricatives
For example,  or  ←  "forest, of the forest" and  <  "ours". Loss of  also occurs, e.g. . These are seen as "accent-free" pronunciations. Dialects generally have different reflexes — in fact, the different reflexes are used as a distinguishing feature between different dialects. For more details, see Finnish phonology.

Word-final n
One important sound change, which has gone to completion in Estonian but occurs idiosyncratically in Finnish, is mutation of word-final  into a glottal stop , orthographically represented by an apostrophe. Both pronunciations can be heard in the Helsinki area. This means that the genitive/accusative form , which is very common in any form of Finnish, is simply noted by a glottal stop. However, this glottal stop undergoes sandhi whenever followed by consonant, or more often than not (see below).

Final vowels
This includes the base form of certain word stems as well as inflectional endings. In nouns this affects the translative case ending  and the 2nd person singular possessive suffix . In verbs, loss of i affects the conditional mood ending  and, in certain verb inflection classes where it is preceded by an s, the preterite ending . These endings occur word-finally in 3rd person forms.

In many dialects loss of final i is commonplace not only in these cases but also elsewhere. 

This is a feature of Western Finnish dialects, found also in Savonian dialects and Estonian. 
  —  'but'
  —  'yes'
  —  elative case, 'out of / away from the inside of'

Vowel clusters and diphthongs
Especially in Helsinki they assimilate, where only the resulting chroneme marks the partitive in many words.
  —  "I speak Finnish"
An  or  cluster also appears in many adjectives:
  —  "dark"
In other areas of Finland, these clusters may have a different fate. (Partitives are unaffected by this.)

 can become  when in contact with another vowel. For example:
  for standard  "I know"
  for standard  "to take away"
  for standard  "to hit"
  for standard  "to bring"

Sandhi
A related phenomenon is the final consonant sandhi. When two words co-occur in the same prosodic unit, the consonant beginning the second word assimilates to the word-final consonant in the first word, creating a long consonant. This is not commonly written down, except in dialectal transcriptions. For example, 
{| class="wikitable"
|+
!
!Writing
!Pronunciation
!Meaning
|-
|Standard
| 
|
| rowspan="2" |“It's coming now”
|-
|Casual 
| 
|
|}

Personal pronouns 
 → 
 → 

Note: these do differ depending on where the speaker is from.

The root words are also shorter:

 → , e.g.  →  "my"
 → , e.g.  →  "yours"

 → 
 → 

For example, the sentence "Did he mistake me for you?" has these forms:

 or 

This also does not carry any pejorative meaning. The words are also changed from their written form.

 →  → 
 →  → 

For example, when pointing out a culprit, the sentence "He broke it." has these forms:

 or

Numerals 
Numerals 1-10 in colloquial spoken Finnish:










When counting out loud, even shorter forms are used, mostly one-syllable words with long vowels:

 / 

The numerals 1–9 have their own names, different from the cardinal numbers used in counting. Numbers that have longer names are often shortened in speech. This may be problematic for a foreigner to understand, if they have learnt words by book:

 (number one)
 (number two)
 (number three)
 (number four)
 (number five) → ,  (Helsinki slang)
 (number six) → 
 (number seven) → 
 /  (number eight) →  / 
 /  (number nine) →  / 
 → ,  (Helsinki slang)

The  suffix normally denotes a group of x people, but on 8 and 9, it doubles as a synonym for the numeral's name.  is also used to describe a figure eight shape.

The regular  /  forms can additionally be used of objects with an ID number.

Verbs

Pronoun usage 
Personal pronouns are used extensively in spoken Finnish whereas in formal forms the pronoun is often optional (indicated in brackets in this article). Furthermore, the pronouns themselves in spoken Finnish are different from those used in formal Finnish.

See the tables below for examples.

Verb forms 
One striking difference between colloquial Finnish and formal Finnish is use of the passive form in the first person plural. Thus for example:

  (formal language)
 (colloquial Finnish)
We're in Helsinki

Therefore, the full present-tense paradigm of  "to speak" in everyday speech is:

 (spoken) —  (standard)
 — 
 — 
 — 
 — 
 — 

This class includes only four frequently used verbs. Consonant gradation and assimilation of the 't' in  may be applied. In the standard language, the correspondence between the two is always regular. In spoken language, some verbs have assimilated oblique forms, while retaining the regular infinitive:

For example, these forms, as such, are represented by the imperatives:
 (standard)
 (word-by-word) "Go or come, but put the door closed and be quiet."
To demonstrate the use of the personal form, the reply is:
 ("I go or come, (I) put the door closed and (I) am quiet").
The infinitives are unchanged, as in:
 ("To go or to come, to put the door closed and to be quiet").
As are participles, despite them using the oblique stem:
 ("Going or coming, door closed-putting and quiet-being").

The 't' at the end of participles ending  (or  etc.)  is often dropped when no consonant follows, or replaced by gemination of the following consonant:

 (formal)
 (colloquial)
I didn't speak
but:

 (colloquial)
I didn't speak to anyone
is actually pronounced as if it were:

 (with examples of gemination)

In the formal language some pronouns are considered optional, but in spoken language the pronoun is usually enunciated but may be optional when answering questions (which puts the person in the proper context).

 ("We are off to Oulu") (informal language)

In the latter example, dropping  would change the meaning from a statement to a suggestion:

 ("Let's go to Oulu") (informal or spoken language suggestion)

Table 2 shows in highlights the areas where there are differences in the structures between formal and informal. Optional pronouns are in brackets. English equivalent is in Table 3.

Questions 
In everyday speech, the  suffix has the  clitic added, becoming , which in turn reduces to :

 →  "am I alive?"
 →  or  "do you (sg.) speak English?"
 →  (via ) "did he/she come yet?"

Many Finns regularly use more than one variation in their speech. The choice might depend among others on the rhythm of the sentence or the (wished) tempo of the discussion. Sometimes it has other clearly communicational purposes e.g. the longer variation might be used to soften an intruding question.

The clitic  is also found in imperatives, e.g. "(I expect you to) go!" Because this is identical to  except for the word order, questions are indicated by word order.

Possessive suffix 
Spoken language has a different grammar for the possessive suffix. In contrast, in the literary language, the pronoun is optional and typically omitted. Compare English in which, e.g., "The house to which this door belongs" would be the correct written form even though "the house whose door this is" would be the more common spoken version.

Here, the pronoun of the literary form is also shown.

Notice that Finnish has no possessive adjectives. The pronouns are regularly inflected, like if "I's house", "you's house", "we's house".

Omission of the negative verb 
When a negative sentence is formed, the main verb goes into the imperative mood and gives all of its inflections to the negative verb , e.g.  → . Usually the word  ("anything") and an expletive is added to the sentence. This means that even if the negative verb  is left out, the meaning is indicated by this context. For example:

 "He doesn't know anything."
 "He know anything." ("doesn't" omitted)

This omission of the negative verb  is considered one of the most recent changes in Finnish. Usually this construction indicates mistrust or frustration. (A parody article by Jaakko Häkkinen calls this , see aggressive mood.) However, it can be a neutral negative statement:  (From this article, you don't learn anything).

Regional variation 
Linguists such as Mielikäinen argue that the dialects of Finnish have been considerably homogenized by 20th century developments of urbanization and other internal population movements to the point that "pure" dialects have disappeared. "Local spoken languages" have developed from standard Finnish to give variety with essentially standard Finnish structure but with some local features. Considerable stigma has been associated with dialects (accurately or not) perceived as rural in the 20th century. People who have moved to the city have adopted a variety resembling standard Finnish, which has been imposed upon dialect speakers by the school, the military and the employers.

Breaking up some consonant clusters on syllable boundaries with an epenthetic vowel is a feature of several dialects, such as those of Ostrobothnia and Savonia:  The neutral vowel is the same as the preceding vowel. For example,  →  "celebration",  →  "strait",  →  "service",  →  "cheap",  →  (via ) "letter F". However, a strong epenthetic vowel is seen as dialectal, and in Helsinki and urbanized areas, indicates origins "in the countryside" (since for Helsinki people, everything but Helsinki is rural).

Tavastian dialects 
Tavastian dialects are diverse because other, surrounding dialects have influenced them. The following features are all found in Finnish spoken in Helsinki, and many of them occur also in some other Tavastian dialects.
 Word  "in that way", which is usually something else like  elsewhere.
 Partitive plurals ending  in generic Finnish become , and likewise the partitive plural  simplifies to :  →  "wet jackets". (also in Nurmijärvi, Kotka)
 The first infinitive, e.g.  "to run", is replaced by the third-person form  "runs" by some speakers. For example, standard  becomes  "Could you run to get it". This form is probably historically speaking not the third-person form, but the colloquial, shortened form  of the third infinitive form , which exhibites a tendency to oust the first infinitive even in the formal language, cf. the old dispute, whether  ("to start running") should be allowed in the formal language or not (the current norm is still  with the first infinitive). (also in Tuusula and Nurmijärvi)
 Abbreviations are common in Finnish spoken in the Southern coast of Finland. Final syllables in frequently used words may erode, like  → ,  → . Case endings might be abbreviated, usually by the loss of the final vowel, e.g.  → . (If a geminate would be "left dangling" at the end of the word, it becomes a single consonant, e.g.  → * → .)
 Helsinki also has a local slang, containing foreign loanwords which may be unintelligible to people from other parts of Finland. Some slang words have spread to the spoken language of youngsters elsewhere in Finland.
 Tampere is also in the area of Tavastian dialects.
 Occasional flapping or deletion of intervocalic "L"; the resulting sound is orthographically nil:  → . This is seen even in the accentless form  ← standard .

North and South Karelia  
 Personal pronouns:  → ,  → ,  → ,  → ,  → ,  → 
 The declined forms also vary, for example  can be ,  or  depending on the regional dialect
 Vowel epenthesis in North Karelia:  → ,  → 
 In some Karelian dialects the end of participles ending -nut or -nyt and -lut drop the vowel instead of 't':  → ,  → ,  → /,  → /,  → ,  → 
 Some Karelian (and Savonian) dialects also use the exessive case:  → ,  → ,  → 
 The North Karelian dialect is a subset of the Savonian dialects, while the South Karelian dialect is a unique Finnish dialect.

Southwestern dialects 
 Abbreviation occurs very often.
 In Turku:  → ,  → 

Savonia 
The Savo dialect is the largest single dialect, and as such, has variants that differ significantly.

Ostrobothnia  
Minor vowel changes, for example,  → . Particularly, the half-long vowels (found in word-final codaless single-vowel syllables) are lengthened into full-blown long vowels, as in  → . For speakers with the flap, there remains a small difference, not generally audible for outsiders. Usually context can be relied on to distinguish the word.
Vaasa, Ostrobothnia, to an extent generic Finnish, too: Many frequently used expressions become clitics - this is optional, though. E.g. pronouns become clitics for the negative verb  and for the verb "to be". In this table, the apostrophe (') is something between a full J and no sound at all.

 Additionally, in the Southwest, the interrogative pronoun  ("who") is replaced by its partitive form,  ("whom"), e.g. , "into where").

See also
List of phonetics topics

References

Generic
Aila Mielikäinen.  
Heikki Paunonen.

External links 
Finnish regional dialects
Savo kaekuu keskellä mualimoo ja näkkyy Internetissä - A text about how Savonian people speak, in the respective dialect.
Some Features of the Vernacular Finnish of Jyväskylä

Finnish dialects